Aleksandar Aranitović (born 24 January 1998) is a Serbian professional basketball for Cibona of the Croatian League and the ABA League. His older brother Petar is also a professional basketball player.

Professional career
Aranitović played in youth categories with Crvena zvezda. He made his debut with Zvezda's first team during the 2015 Serbian SuperLeague season. On July 16, 2015, Crvena zvezda loaned him to Mega Leks for the 2015–16 season. On January 25, 2016, he signed his first professional contract with Crvena zvezda until 2020. While playing with Mega Leks, he got injured in early February 2016, and later missed the rest of the 2015–16 season. In December 2016, he renewed his injury and later missed the whole 2016–17 season.

On August 9, 2017, Aranitović signed a three-year contract with Partizan. Partizan parted ways with him in December 2019.

In January 2020, Aranitović signed for ADA Blois of the French LNB Pro B.

On September 30, 2020, Aranitović signed a try-out contract with Heroes Den Bosch. In January 2021, Aranitović signed with Mladost Zemun. On September 27, 2022, Aranitović signed a contract with Cibona of the Croatian League.

National team career
With Serbia's junior national team, Aranitović won the silver medal at the 2013 FIBA Europe Under-16 Championship and the bronze medal at the 2014 FIBA Under-17 World Championship. He also played at the 2014 FIBA Europe Under-16 Championship, 2015 FIBA Europe Under-18 Championship and the 2015 FIBA Under-19 World Championship.

References

External links 
 Aleksandar Aranitović at aba-liga.com
 Aleksandar Aranitović at eurobasket.com
 Aleksandar Aranitović at fiba.com

1998 births
Living people
ABA League players
ADA Blois Basket 41 players
Basketball players from Belgrade
Basketball League of Serbia players
BC Dzūkija players
KK Cibona players
KK Crvena zvezda players
KK Mega Basket players
KK Partizan players
Heroes Den Bosch players
Serbian expatriate basketball people in Croatia
Serbian expatriate basketball people in France
Serbian expatriate basketball people in Lithuania
Serbian expatriate basketball people in the Netherlands
Serbian men's basketball players
Shooting guards